.týždeň (meaning Week in English) is a weekly Slovak news magazine that resides in Bratislava, Slovakia.

History and profile
.týždeň was first published in December 2004. Published weekly by W PRESS  S.A.,  the magazine focuses on topics relating to society, politics and culture. It is functional in shaping the public opinion in Slovakia. The visual content is one of its distinctive aspects. 

The editor-in-chief of .týždeň is Štefan Hríb. Journalists writing for .týždeň include Elena Akácsová, Peter Balik, Eva Čobejová, Marina Gálisová, Martin Hanus, Lukáš Krivošik, Juraj Kušnierik, Jozef Majchrák, and Francis Šebej.

Vladimir Čečetka and Ladislav Rehak have been major shareholders of W PRESS since its inception. Fedor Gál is on the supervisory board of the company. In late 2007, he was joined by the publisher Stephen Meszlen (of Komárom printers) and Rudolf Zajac. Ladislav Rehak sold his shares.

References

External links
Official website

2004 establishments in Slovakia
News magazines published in Europe
Magazines established in 2004
Mass media in Bratislava
Magazines published in Slovakia
Weekly magazines